NA-133 Kasur-III is a constituency for the National Assembly of Pakistan. The constituency was created in 2018.

Area
The constituency mainly consists of Pattoki Tehsil and includes areas of the Tehsil, inclusive of the city of Phool Nagar, Balloki, which were previously included in the now-abolished constituencies of NA-141 (Kasur-IV) and NA-142 (Kasur-V). Some areas of Pattoki Tehsil, namely, Chak no. 34, Chakoki, and Wan Adhan, are included in the newly created NA-139 (Kasur-III).

Members of Parliament

2018-2022: NA-140 Kasur-IV

Election 2018 

General elections were held on 25 July 2018.

See also
NA-132 Kasur-II
NA-134 Kasur-IV

References 

Kasur